The 2020 F4 Chinese Championship (Shell Helix FIA F4 Chinese Championship) was the sixth season of the F4 Chinese Championship. It began on 19 September at the Zhuhai International Circuit and ended on 22 November at Guia Circuit as a part of the 2020 Macau Grand Prix.

Teams and drivers

Race calendar and results 
The season was due to start on April 18-19 as a support series to 2020 Chinese Grand Prix but the event has been called off in view of the health concerns caused by COVID-19 pandemic. The calendar has been adjusted many times and the up to date version has been published on 2 September and features 3 round calendar with Round 1 and 2 taking place at Zhuhai International Circuit and the final stage to be announced. The confirmation of Guia Circuit as the place of the last competition was declared on 16 September. The races of the final round granted double points to the driver's championship.

Notes

Championship standings 
Points were awarded as follows:

Drivers' Championship

Teams' Cup

References

External links 
  

F4 Chinese Championship seasons
2020 in Chinese motorsport
2020 in Formula 4
Chinese F4